WYPA (89.5 FM) is a non–commercial Christian Worship formatted radio station licensed to serve Cherry Hill, New Jersey. The station is owned by Educational Media Foundation and is a member of the nationally syndicated Air1 radio network.

WYPA uses HD Radio, and simulcasts the classical programming of WWFM on its HD2 subchannel.

History
The station signed on for the first time in 1986 as WEEE, "The Cherry Hill Station" which featured an Easy Listening format and broadcast Cherry Hill related announcements, town meetings and local sports. In 1995, the station changed its call sign to WSJI and featured Contemporary Christian music and preaching.

Formerly owned by Thomas Moffit Sr.'s Broadcast Learning Center, the station was sold to California–based EMF Broadcasting's "K-Love" radio network for $2.5M US; $600,000 cash at closing (including $122,500 escrow deposit) plus $1.85 million promissory note. The sale was brokered by John Pierce and Co. LLC and represented the Educational Media Foundation's entry into the Greater Philadelphia Metropolitan radio market. The sale, which began in August 2006, was finalized on 10 January 2007 and the station switched to K–Love's Network feed at 17:00 (EST) the same day. The station's new call sign was WKVP, ostensibly "(K)lo(V)e (P)hiladelphia".

On November 5, 2013, the station changed its call sign to WYPA. The WKVP call sign moved to EMF's Camden, New Jersey station, the former WWIQ (and for 43 years, Family Radio's WKDN).

References

External links
 Air1's official website

Air1 radio stations
Radio stations established in 1985
1985 establishments in New Jersey
Educational Media Foundation radio stations
YPA